Thomas Kwesi Quartey born December 17, 1950, is a Ghanaian diplomat who has been Vice Chairperson of African Union Commission since January 30, 2017 and Deputy Minister of Foreign Affairs and Regional Integration of Ghana from 2013 to 2016.

Life and career 
Born in Ghana, Kwesi is a University of Ghana alumnus and a professional lawyer. He was secretary to the President of Ghana in 2015, he served as Ghana's Permanent Representative to the United Nations in 2012.

He worked in Ghana's High Commissions and Embassies abroad and also served as Ghana's Deputy Head of Mission in London.

References 



1950 births
Living people
Ghanaian diplomats